"Anywhere" is a 2002 single by English songwriter Beth Orton. It was released both as a CD, and as a DVD (the only Beth Orton release to appear on DVD format) and peaked at #55 in the UK charts. The song appears on the album Daybreaker.

Track listing

CD: Heavenly / HVN 125CDS United Kingdom 
 "Anywhere" - 4:38
 "Beautiful World" - 4:09
 "Anywhere (Two Lone Swordsmen mix)" - 4:02

 CD includes "Anywhere" video on enhanced portion.

DVD: Heavenly / HVN 125DVD United Kingdom 
 "Anywhere (Two Lone Swordsmen mix)" 
 "Anywhere (album version)"
 "Concrete Sky (Live at the Social)"

 Track 1 is video, Track 2-3 are audio only.

2x12": Heavenly / HVN 12512P United Kingdom 
 "Anywhere (Two Lone Swordsmen Remix Vocal)" - 5:49
 "Anywhere (Two Lone Swordsmen Remix Instrumental)" - 5:49

 "Anywhere (Adrian Sherwood's Off Me Rocker Version)" - 5:09
 "Anywhere (Adrian Sherwood's Off Me Head Cut)" - 4:37

 UK promo

12": Heavenly / HVN 12512PX United Kingdom 
 "Anywhere (Photek Tekdub Remix)"

 UK promo

Beth Orton songs
2002 singles
2002 songs
Heavenly Recordings singles
Astralwerks singles
Songs written by Beth Orton